Latent homosexuality is an erotic attraction toward members of the same sex that is not consciously experienced or expressed in overt action. This may mean a hidden inclination or potential for interest in homosexual relationships, which is either suppressed or not recognized, and which has not yet been explored, or may never be explored.

The term was originally proposed by Sigmund Freud. Some argue that latent homosexuality is a potentially iatrogenic effect (that is, it is not present until suggested by a therapist).  Others argue that the term latent is not truly applicable in the case of homosexual urges, since they are often not in the unconscious or unexpressed category, but rather exist in the conscious mind and are (often violently) repressed on a conscious level.

Links to homophobia

A theory that homophobia is a result of latent homosexuality was put forth in the late 20th century. A 1996 study from the University of Georgia by Henry Adams, Lester Wright Jr., and Bethany Lohr was conducted concerning this theory. The research was done on 64 heterosexual men, 35 of whom exhibited homophobic traits and 29 who did not. They were assigned to groups on the basis of their scores on the Index of Homophobia (W.W. Hudson & W.A. Ricketts, 1980). The groups did not differ in aggression.

Three tests were conducted using penile plethysmography. While there was no difference in response when the men were exposed to heterosexual and lesbian pornography, there was a major difference in response when the men were exposed to male homosexual pornography.

The researchers reported that 24% of the non-homophobic men showed some degree of tumescence in response to the male homosexual video, compared to 54% of the subjects who scored high on the homophobia scale. In addition, 66% of the non-homophobic group showed no significant increases in tumescence after this video, but only 20% of the homophobic men failed to display any arousal. Additionally, when the participants rated their degree of sexual arousal later, the homophobic men significantly underestimated their degree of arousal by the male homosexual video.

The results of this study indicate that individuals who score in the homophobic range and admit negative affect toward homosexuality demonstrate significant sexual arousal to male homosexual erotic stimuli.

A possible explanation is found in various psychoanalytic theories, which have generally explained homophobia as a threat to an individual's own homosexual impulses causing repression, denial, or reaction formation (or all three; West, 1977). Generally, these varied explanations conceive of homophobia as one type of latent homosexuality where persons either are unaware of or deny their homosexual urges.

Another explanation of these data is found in Barlow, Sakheim, and Beck's (1983) theory of the role of anxiety and attention in sexual responding. It is possible that viewing homosexual stimuli causes negative emotions such as anxiety in homophobic men but not in nonhomophobic men. Because anxiety has been shown to enhance arousal and erection, this theory would predict increases in erection in homophobic men.

A 2013 study did not find any connection between homophobia and attraction to the same sex. Same-sex attraction was related to positive evaluations of gay men and lesbians among female participants.

Links to environment
Situational homosexuality may be due to exposure to a single-gender environment, such as a single-sex school, prison, or military service.

In fiction
In Kingsley Amis' 1966 book The Anti-Death League, the main character is introduced while resisting treatment for repressed homosexuality – which a doctor believes that he has – despite the man being openly homosexual.

Latent homosexual themes were a common theme of science fiction films of the 1950s.

In the 1999 film American Beauty, the character Colonel Fitts (Chris Cooper) is depicted as being a latent homosexual. Throughout the film, Fitts makes several statements that are narrow-minded and homophobic, and it disturbs the colonel that his son Ricky might be homosexual. However, toward the end of the film, it is revealed that Fitts has sexual feelings toward men when he approaches his neighbor Lester Burnham (Kevin Spacey) and kisses him, but Lester rejects Col. Fitts, and this greatly humiliates him.

See also

Bi-curious
Closeted
Coming out
Heteroflexible
Outing
Same-sex attraction
Denial
G0y
Psychological repression
Gay-for-pay
Prehomosexual

References

Sources

External links
 
  – The website describes this excerpt as an example of homophobia from the 1960s.
 
Homosexuality
Sexual orientation and science